Great Falls Central Catholic High School is a private, Roman Catholic high school in Great Falls, Montana. It is one of three Catholic high schools in the Roman Catholic Diocese of Great Falls-Billings.

Background
Great Falls Central Catholic was originally established in 1951 from a merger of St. Mary's High School, the Ursuline Academy for Girls and St. Thomas Home boarding school. It closed in 1973 and the building was sold to the Great Falls Public Schools. The school was reestablished at the University of Great Falls in 2001. It moved to its current location when it was built in 2008.

Notes and references

Catholic secondary schools in Montana
Educational institutions established in 2001
School buildings completed in 2008
Buildings and structures in Great Falls, Montana
Schools in Cascade County, Montana
2001 establishments in Montana
Roman Catholic Diocese of Great Falls–Billings